Steven Joseph Sitko (November 16, 1917 – January 8, 2003) was an American football player for the University of Notre Dame, and a professional basketball player.

As a student at Fort Wayne Central High School, Sitko was best known for his basketball skills, earning the Gimbel Prize for scholastics and sportsmanship in 1936 and reaching the state finals.

Sitko became the starting quarterback at Notre Dame for two seasons, and would often confuse broadcasters when running Elmer Layden's "S" backfield, where all of the backs would be heavily involved in all aspects of the running and passing attack.  His teams finished 8-1 (ranked #5) in 1938 and 7-2 (ranked #13) in 1939. He was named to the 1939 College Football All Polish-American Team.

Although he was selected by the Washington Redskins in the 22nd round of the 1940 NFL Draft, Sitko chose instead to play in the National Basketball League for the Akron Goodyear Wingfoots.  Meanwhile, his cousin Emil Sitko would have a stellar career at Notre Dame as a halfback under Frank Leahy.

Sitko was inducted into the Indiana Basketball Hall of Fame in 1997.

References

 Indiana Basketball Hall of Fame
 

1917 births
2003 deaths
American people of Polish descent
Akron Goodyear Wingfoots players
American football quarterbacks
American men's basketball players
Basketball players from Fort Wayne, Indiana
Cleveland Allmen Transfers players
Guards (basketball)
Notre Dame Fighting Irish football players
Notre Dame Fighting Irish men's basketball players
Players of American football from Akron, Ohio
Players of American football from Fort Wayne, Indiana